Jharkhand State Electricity Board is a Government of Jharkhand enterprise, entrusted with the generation and distribution of electrical power in the state of Jharkhand, India. It suffers a loss of more than 1,000 crore (USD 200mn) every year.

In 2011, it was revealed that in the last ten years, as much as 80 crores in outstanding dues to various units had been waived. For example, ex-Chief Minister Madhu Koda, in prison for graft since 2008, waived of a 10 crore bill from a company owned by fellow minister Vinod Sinha, who is also in jail on graft charges.

The official website for the boards is https://jbvnl.co.in/

Jharkhand State Electricity Board is presently known as Jharkhand Bijli Vitran Nigam Limited (JBVNL).

JBVNL Bill Will be Available at Home - Send Meter Photo in WhatsApp

Keeping this in mind, Jharkhand Bijli Vitran Nigam Limited is going to do a unique experiment for the first time for revenue collection. For this, separate WhatsApp numbers have been issued as per different power divisions. To avail of this service, the consumer will send a meter photograph and send it. After this the JBVNL Jharkhand bill will be received on WhatsApp itself. For this, the consumers will have to send the consumer number, kWh-meter reading and the meter's serial number. After reading the electricity meter, the JBVNL bijli bill will be sent to the consumer's WhatsApp number. Now, consumers will be able to make online or offline JBVNL Bill Payment.

JBVNL Whatsapp Customer Care Number:

Doranda, Hinoo, Birsa Chowk: 9431135623

HEC, Dhurwa: 9431135633

Tupudana, Hatia, Singhmod: 9431135632

RMCH, Morhabadi, Bariatu: 9431135602

Lalpur, Kantatoli, Karam Toli: 9431135626

Kokar, Namkum: 9431135627

Main Road, Hindpiri: 9431135624

Ashok Nagar, Pundag: 9431135646

Harmu, Kishoreganj: 9431135625

Upper Bazar, Court, Pahari: 9431135628

Kanke, Pithoriya: 9431135629

Tatisilway, Silli, Rampur: 9431135631

Bundu, Tamad: 9431135638

BIT, Ormanjhi, Booty More: 9431135676

Ratu Road, Piska Mor, Kamde: 9431135630

Mandar, Khalari, Bachra: 9431135635

Ratu, Itki, Bedo: 943113567

PEG: 9431135636

Torpa: 9431135637

Power Plants
 Patratu Thermal Power Station. It an installed capacity of 840 MW. The generating units of the power plant are very old and is operating at around 10% PLF. The power plant is undergoing renovation.
 Subernrekha Hydel Power Station, Sikidiri, a 130 MW (2x65 MW) hydel power plant.

See also
Patratu Super Thermal Power Project
Bihar State Electricity Board

References

External links
 official website
 Official website of Jharkhand Urja Utpadan Nigam Limited

State electricity agencies of India
Energy in Jharkhand
State agencies of Jharkhand
Electric-generation companies of India
Year of establishment missing